William Dudley may refer to:

 William Dudley (colonel) (1766–1813), War of 1812 officer in the Kentucky Militia
 William Dudley (18th century), a Roxbury, Massachusetts landowner and a namesake of Dudley, Massachusetts
 William Dudley (bishop) (died 1483), bishop of Durham
 William C. Dudley (born 1952), economist at the New York Federal Reserve
 William Harold Dudley (1890–1949), painter
 William Lofland Dudley (1859–1914), chemistry professor
 William Russel Dudley (1849–1911), botanist
 William S. Dudley (born 1936), U.S. naval historian
 William Wade Dudley (1842–1909), soldier in the American Civil War, then became a lawyer, a government official and a Republican campaigner
 William Dudley (designer) (born 1947), British theatre designer
 William Dudley (swimmer) (1931–1978), American swimmer
 William Edward Dudley (1868–1938), administrator in the British co-operative movement
 Sir William Dudley, 1st Baronet (1597–1670), English politician
 Bill Dudley (1921–2010), American football player

See also